Charles Eastman (1858–1939) was a Santee Dakota physician, writer, national lecturer, and reformer.

Charles Eastman may also refer to:

 Charles K. Eastman (1929–2009), American screenwriter and script doctor
 Charles M. Eastman (1940–2020), American professor of architecture
 Charles R. Eastman (1868–1918), American geologist and palaeontologist
 Charles S. Eastman (1864–1939), American politician and lawyer